Carmen Possnig (born 1988) is an Austrian physician and reserve astronaut. After graduating from the Medical University of Graz in 2014, Possnig was a general practitioner resident in Vienna for a few years before working as a research medical doctor at Concordia Station in Antarctica for more than a year starting in 2017. Since 2020, she has been a doctoral student in space physiology at the University of Innsbruck. She was chosen as a reserve in the European Astronaut Corps in 2022.

Early life and medical career 
Possnig was born in Klagenfurt, Austria, in 1988. She completed her studies at the Medical University of Graz in 2014. Her thesis, on the "Effects of Artificial Gravity Exposure on Orthostatic Tolerance Times in Men and Women", was written with the German Aerospace Center and supervised by professors  and Helmut Hinghofer-Szalkay.

Possnig spent 13 months in 2017 and 2018 as a research medical doctor at Concordia Station in Antarctica, where she led the medical rescue team, and conducted studies for the European Space Agency on how the human body adapts to extreme environment of the South Pole. She wrote a book on her experience working in Antarctica, titled "Südlich vom Ende der Welt" ("South of the End of the World"), published by Ludwig Buchverlag in 2020. She began a PhD at the University of Innsbruck focused on space physiology in 2020 and in 2022 became a research medical doctor at the Medes Institute for Space Medicine and Physiology in Toulouse, France.

Astronaut career 
The European Space Agency selected Possnig as a reserve astronaut for the 2022 selection of astronauts of the European Astronaut Corps. There were more than 22,500 applicants to the new class of astronauts. If chosen to carry out a space mission, Possnig would become the first Austrian woman to fly in space.

References 

Living people
1988 births
Austrian physicians
Austrian women physicians
European Space Agency personnel
21st-century Austrian physicians
21st-century Austrian women